Robert "Big Bob" Hill (c. 1934 – May 17, 2016) was an American football and baseball coach. He served as the head football coach at Jackson State University from 1971 to 1976, compiling a record of 44–15–1. During his tenure at Jackson State, he mentored future Pro Football Hall of Famers Walter Payton and Jackie Slater. Hill was fired from his post during the 1976 season and replaced by his assistant, W. C. Gorden.

Hill played college football at Jackson State and was selected in the 20th round of the 1956 NFL Draft by the Baltimore Colts. He was the first Jackson State player to sign a National Football League (NFL) contract. Hill was released by the Colts and signed by the Pittsburgh Steelers in August 1956. After coaching at Magee High School and Rowan High School in Mississippi, Hill joined the Jackson State football staff in 1963 and worked as an assistant under Edward Clemons, Rod Paige, and Ulysses S. McPherson. Hill also coached baseball at Jackson State.

Hill died on May 17, 2016.

Head coaching record

College football

Notes

References

External links
 

1934 births
2016 deaths
Jackson State Tigers baseball coaches
Jackson State Tigers football coaches
Jackson State Tigers football players
High school football coaches in Mississippi
African-American coaches of American football
African-American players of American football
African-American baseball coaches
20th-century African-American sportspeople